Charles Henry Conrad Wright (1869–1957) was a professor of French language and literature and author of several books, notably his 990-page A History of French Literature (1912). He specialized in French literature of the 16th and 17th centuries.

Charles Henry Conrad Wright was born ten weeks after the death of his father. His father Charles Henry Wright had married Margaret B. Upham McMaster in 1868 and acquired a stepdaughter Marian Lois Wright (1861–1888), who was born Marian Lois McMaster. In 1874, Margaret Wright with her son and daughter sailed from Boston to Liverpool, England. After studying art in Paris, Marian Lois Wright returned in 1880 to the United States. From 1874 to 1884 Margaret Wright lived with her son in various European countries, including England, France (where C. H. Conrad Wright became fluent in French), and Italy. C. H. Conrad Wright studied at the Collège de Honfleur. In 1884 mother and son returned to the United States and eventually settled in 1886 in Cambridge, Massachusetts, where C. H. Conrad Wright attended Harvard University.

C. H. Conrad Wright received an M.A. from Oxford in 1899, after receiving a bachelor's degree there in 1895.  He spent the academic year 1908–1909 on a sabbatical trip to Europe.

Selected publications

as editor:

References

External links 

1869 births
1957 deaths
Harvard University faculty
Harvard University alumni
Alumni of Trinity College, Oxford